Petr Maděra (July 10, 1970, Ostrov nad Ohří) is a Czech poet and novelist.

After graduating from a grammar school, he studied landscape engineering at the Agricultural College in Prague. He specialised mainly in landscape architecture, dendrology and pisciculture. After that, he worked as an educator of the blind, and also as a landscape environmentalist for the district authorities in Prague-East. At the end of the 1990s, he took part in editing the Weles magazine, an important platform for the most recent poets. Nowadays he is dealing with applied graphics and works as an editor of a number of geology-oriented magazines and publications. He lives with his wife and two sons in Prague.

Works 

His work is characterized by very original poetics as far as both imagery and austere, distinctly polished expression are concerned. These qualities refer to the inspiration by Vladimír Holan's poetry. Together with the collections of poetry by Bogdan Trojak, Petr Hruška, Petr Borkovec, Pavel Kolmačka and J. H. Krchovský, Maděra's two highly praised  poetry books, Krevel and Komorní hůrka have formed the horizon of recent Czech poetry. Has widely published in the following literary periodicals: Iniciály, Modrý květ, Weles, Host, Tvar, Texty, Sedmá generace etc.

Poetry
 Krevel (Host, 1997)
 Komorní hůrka (Host, 2001)

Prose
 Černobílé rty (Protis, 2007) - a novella about "love in the darkness"

Participation in anthologies
 Holan 90
 Almanach Pant
 Cesty šírání
 Přetržená nit
 Skřípavá hudba vrat
 Co si myslí andělíček
 S Tebou sám - Antologie současné české milostné poezie
 Básně pro děti – Jak se učil vítr číst
 Antologie nové české literatury 1995-2004
 Antologie české poezie
 Báseň mého srdce / poezie jako výraz osobnosti / rukopisy, portréty, kréda současných českých básníků

References and external links 

 Portal of Czech literature, in Czech and German
 Online anthology of Czech poetry, in Czech

About the author in Czech press
 Čermáček, P.: Neprohráblými uhlíky slov. Sedmá generace 11, 2001, s. 18.
 Čermáček, P.: Příběhy Petra Maděry. Psí víno 19, 2001, s. 25.
 Fridrich, R.: Syrové maso básní P. Maděry. Pandora 1, 1997, s. 33.
 Harák, I.: Tři z Hosta. Landek 4, 1998, s. 50–51.
 Hrbáč, P. : Mimořádný básník. Tvar 7, 1997, s. 23.
 Jareš, M.: Tři polohy současné české poezie. Tvar 4, 2002, s. 16–17.
 Kotrla, P.: Podařilo se. Tvar 7, 1997, s. 23.
 Kovářík, M.: Petr Maděra: Andělské chlebíčky na dalekou cestu. Tvar 20, 2001, s. 20–21.
 Málková, I.: O nejmladší poezii české II. Ostrava, Scholaforum 1997, s. 12–13.
 Mlejnek, J.: Libovolné efekty. Mladá fronta Dnes 209, 7. 9. 2001, s. 6.
 Motýl, P.: Několik básnických knížek. In Margiana. Host 2, 1998, s. 83–88.
 Staněk, J.: 90. léta v české poezii. Tvar 11, 2000, s. 12–13.

Czech poets
Czech male poets
Living people
1970 births
People from Ostrov (Karlovy Vary District)